Gavin Ward may refer to:
 Gavin Ward (footballer) (born 1970), English footballer
 Gavin Ward (musician), guitarist of Bolt Thrower
 Gavin Ward (engineer) (born 1984), Canadian engineer